The Armenian Patriotic Society of Europe was founded in 1885 by Garabed Hagopian and Mekertich Portukalian. Its goal was to facilitate the Armenian diaspora in providing aid to their native land, both financially and politically due to Armenia's oppressed condition at the time. The headquarters of the Society were in Chesilton Road, Fulham, England.

See also 

 Armenia-European Union relations
 Foreign relations of Armenia

Armenian nationalism
Armenian diaspora